is a Japanese actress. She won the Award for Best Supporting Actress at the 13th Yokohama Film Festival for Ōte and Yumeji. In 1994, she married the actor Mitsuru Fukikoshi. They divorced in 2005 after having one child.

Filmography
 A Sign Days (1989)
 Ōte (1991)
 Yumeji (1991)
 Calmi Cuori Appassionati (2001)

References

Living people
Japanese film actresses
Japanese television actresses
People from Sapporo
Year of birth missing (living people)